Hylenaea is a genus of flowering plants belonging to the family Celastraceae.

Its native range is Hispaniola, Trinidad, Panama to Southern Tropical America.

Species:

Hylenaea comosa 
Hylenaea praecelsa 
Hylenaea unguiculata

References

Celastraceae
Celastrales genera